Mipus alis is a species of sea snail, a marine gastropod mollusk in the family Muricidae, the murex snails or rock snails.

Description
The length of the shell attains 16.8 mm.

Distribution
This marine species occurs off Tonga.

References

alis
Gastropods described in 2008